Adrián Čermák (born 1 July 1993) is a Slovak football midfielder who currently plays for FC Zbrojovka Brno.

Club career

ŠK Slovan Bratislava
Čermák made his debut for Slovan Bratislava against PŠC Pezinok in the 2nd leg of the 2011–12 Slovak Cup.

External links
 
 Futbalnet profile

References

1993 births
Living people
Sportspeople from Malacky
Slovak footballers
Slovak expatriate footballers
Slovakia youth international footballers
Association football midfielders
Slovak Super Liga players
Czech National Football League players
ŠK Slovan Bratislava players
FC Nitra players
MFK Skalica players
SK Dynamo České Budějovice players
FC Silon Táborsko players
SK Líšeň players
FC Zbrojovka Brno players
Slovak expatriate sportspeople in the Czech Republic
Expatriate footballers in the Czech Republic